The Celestials may refer to:
 Celestial (comics)
 The Celestials (A song by The Smashing  Pumpkins)